The Hotel Maison de Ville is located in the French Quarter north of Jackson Square, in New Orleans, Louisiana. They consist of a historic hotel building (1800), a garden courtyard, and separate former slave quarters (1750s)—now cottages.

History

Hotel
Hotel Maison de Ville building was constructed after the disastrous Great New Orleans Fire of 1788, which destroyed much of 18th century New Orleans. The Maison de Ville was a two-story dwelling built by New France colonist Jean-Baptiste Lilie Sarpy in 1800. 

The playwright Tennessee Williams (1911–1983) was a frequent guest at the hotel in the 20th century.  His favorite room was named in his honor.

The former carriage house, adjacent to the Hotel Maison de Ville's courtyard, was converted to guest lodgings.

Slave quarters
Four former slave quarters are located across the courtyard.  They were built fifty years before the main building—circa 1750s—and are now used for guest accommodations.  These cottages, along with the Old Ursuline Convent, are believed to be the oldest buildings in New Orleans, though research has been hampered by the loss of historical documents. 

In the 19th and early 20th century, the cottages were also used as garconnières or bachelor quarters. The Créoles often provided separate buildings where their adult sons lived until marriage, giving them privacy.

Present day
Hotel Maison De Ville was reopened in 2012 as its own entity, under new ownership.

External links
 Hotel Maison de Ville website

French Quarter
Hotels in New Orleans
French colonial architecture
French
Slave cabins and quarters in the United States